Eirik Vespestad Mæland (born 15 February 1989) is a Norwegian football coach and former footballer who currently is assistant coach of Eliteserien club Molde.

Club career 
He started his senior career in the Norwegian team Haugesund in 2007. He made his debut on 20 June 2007 in a 4–2 loss against Bryne.

Managerial career
On 13 January 2021, Mæland was appointed head coach of Kongsvinger. On 13 December 2022, Molde announced that Mæland would become first team assistant coach at the club.

Career statistics 
Sources:

References 

1989 births
Living people
People from Stord
Norwegian footballers
Bremnes IL players
FK Haugesund players
Fredrikstad FK players
Kongsvinger IL Toppfotball players
Eliteserien players
Norwegian First Division players
Association football midfielders
Norwegian football managers
Kongsvinger IL Toppfotball managers
Sportspeople from Vestland